This is the list of Schedule IV drugs as defined by the United States Controlled Substances Act.
The following findings are required for drugs to be placed in this schedule:
 The drug or other substance has a low potential for abuse relative to the drugs or other substances in schedule III.
 The drug or other substance has a currently accepted medical use in treatment in the United States.
 Abuse of the drug or other substance may lead to limited physical dependence or psychological dependence relative to the drugs or other substances in schedule III.

The complete list of Schedule IV drugs follows. The Administrative Controlled Substances Code Number for each drug is included.

Narcotics

Depressants

†Flunitrazepam has not been approved by the Food and Drug Administration for medical use, and is considered to be an illegal drug.
†Temazepam may require a specially coded prescription in certain States.

Lorcaserin

Stimulants

Others

References

Controlled Substances Act
Drug-related lists